Protein FAM134C is a protein that in humans is encoded by the FAM134C (family with sequence similarity 134, member C) gene.

Model organisms

Model organisms have been used in the study of FAM134C function. A conditional knockout mouse line, called Fam134ctm2a(EUCOMM)Wtsi was generated as part of the International Knockout Mouse Consortium program — a high-throughput mutagenesis project to generate and distribute animal models of disease to interested scientists.

Male and female animals underwent a standardized phenotypic screen to determine the effects of deletion. Twenty four tests were carried out on mutant mice and four significant abnormalities were observed. Homozygous animals had an abnormal xyphoid process and eye morphology. Females had increased indirect calorimetry parameters while males had an increased susceptibility to bacterial infection.

References

Further reading 
 

Genes mutated in mice